BRP Bagacay (MRRV-4410) is the ninth ship of the Parola-class patrol vessels of the Philippine Coast Guard.

Design and features
The Philippine Coast Guard clarified that the ship is a law enforcement vessel and is designed to conduct environmental and humanitarian missions, as well as maritime security operations and patrol missions.

The ship was designed with a bulletproof navigation bridge, and is equipped with fire monitors, night vision capability, a work boat, and radio direction finder capability.

The ship will be equipped with communications and radio monitoring equipment from Rohde & Schwarz, specifically the M3SR Series 4400 and Series 4100 software-defined communication radios, and DDF205 radio monitoring equipment. These equipment enhances the ship's reconnaissance, pursuit and communications capabilities.

Construction, delivery and commissioning
After completed sea trials in Yokohama, Japan, BRP Bagacay arrived at the Philippine Coast Guard National Headquarters on May 31, 2018.

On August 23, 2018, BRP Bagacay and  commissioned into Philippine Coast Guard fleet.

Service history

In November 2018, the ship was transferred to Banguingui, Sulu (originally named Tongkil) to augment the security forces in that area.

In July 2021, the BRP Bagacay intercepted the Motor Boat Dynasty which was carrying 70 boxes of Smuggled Cigarettes off the Coast of Zamboanga City

In early August 2021, the Ship conducted a Medical Evacuation (MEDEVAC) of an Australian Veterinarian from the Livestock carrier MV Maysora off the Coast of Zamboanga City. The Veterinarian suffered a Bone fracture when he accidentally fell from a Cattle Pen while working

In late August 2021, the BRP Bagacay rescued a French National whose Yacht the Ouma went adrift after suffering Engine trouble off the Waters of Tubbataha Reef in the Sulu Sea.

References

Bagacay
2018 ships
Ships built by Japan Marine United